Bartolomea Acciaioli or Acciajuoli (died around 1396) was the wife of Theodore I Palaiologos, Despot of the Morea from 1385. She was the elder daughter of Nerio I Acciaioli, who held large estates in Frankish Greece. She was famed for her beauty and her father gave her in marriage to the Despot to seal their alliance. Since her father and husband's relations deteriorated in the early 1390s, her father disinherited her in favor of her younger sister, Francesca, and their illegitimate brother, Antonio. Barolomea died childless.

Early life

 

Bartolomea was the elder of the two daughters of Nerio I Acciaioli and Agnes de' Saraceni who get married before 1381. Nerio Acciaioli was a scion of a prominent banking house of Florence. In the 1360s, he settled in Frankish Greece where he seized large domains, including the important town of Corinth. Agnes de' Saraceni's father, Saraceno, was a Venetian citizen who lived in Negroponte. 

Most details of Bartolomea's life are unknown. The Byzantine historian, Laonikos Chalkokondyles recorded that she was "said to be the most beautiful of all the women who at that time were renowned for their beauty". She was regarded the principal heir to her father's vast domains, because she had no legitimate brothers.

Despoina

Nerio Acciaiouli married Bartolomea off to Theodore I Palaiologos, Despot of Morea, in 1385. The marriage sealed her father and husband's alliance against the Navarrese Company (a group of mercenaries who had settled in the Peloponnese in the 1370s). Before the marriage, Nerio pledged that Bartolomea would inherit Corinth if he died. Theodore I loved his beautiful wife and she was always loyal to him, but their marriage was childless. Relations between Bartolomea's father and husband became tense after the Navarrese captured Nerio in 1389. They released him only after he promised to persuade Theodore to cede Argos to the Venetians, but Theodore I was unwilling to accept his father-in-law's advice, although the Venetians could hold Nerio's town, Megara, until they received Argos from Theodore.

Nerio Acciaioli made his last will in Corinth on 17 September 1394. He actually disinherited Bartolomea, because he distributed his properties between his younger daughter, Francesca, his illegitimate son, Antonio, and the church of Saint Mary (the Parthenon) of Athens. Nerio only bequeathed Bartolomea the release of 9,700 ducats that her husband had borrowed from him. The last will outraged both Bartolomea and Theodore I and they decided to seize Corinth after her father died on 25 September. They could not prevent Francesca from taking possession of Corinth, although Theodore I launched an attack against the town in October. A Turk invasion of the Morea forced Theodore I to abandon the military campaign in early 1395. After the Turks withdrew from the Morea, Bartolomea laid an ambush to her sister between the Isthmus of Corinth and Megara, but she could not capture Francesca. Francesca's husband, Carlo I Tocco, thought that he would be unable to keep Corinth and sold her claim to the town to Theodore I in 1396.

Bartolomea died around 1396. Her husband survived her, but he suffered from severe depression until he died in 1407. A large sum of money that Bartolomea had deposited at a Venetian bank was given to her brother-in-law, Manuel II Palaiologos in the same year.

References

Sources

Acciaioli family
People of the Despotate of the Morea